Pardi railway station is a small railway station on the Western Railway network in the state of Gujarat, India. Pardi railway station is 11 km away from Valsad railway station. Passenger, MEMU and few Express trains halt at Pardi railway station.

Major trains

Following Express trains halt at Pardi railway station in both directions:

 19023/24 Mumbai Central–Firozpur Janata Express
 19215/16 Mumbai Central–Porbandar Saurashtra Express

References

See also
 Valsad district

Railway stations in Valsad district
Mumbai WR railway division